The Tierser Tal (also) is a side valley of the Eisacktal in South Tyrol, Italy.

References 
Alpenverein South Tyrol

External links 

Valleys of South Tyrol